C. Samuel Storms is an American Calvinist Charismatic and amillennial theologian, teacher and author. He is currently pastor emeritus of Bridgeway Church in Oklahoma City and past-president of the Evangelical Theological Society.

Life
Storms was born on February 6, 1951, in Shawnee, Oklahoma. After graduating from the University of Oklahoma, Storms became the interim pastor of Dallas Independent Presbyterian Church in Dallas, Texas. In 1977, he became an associate pastor at Believers Chapel in Dallas, where he an associate pastor until 1985. In 1985, he became the pastor at Christ Community Church in Ardmore, Oklahoma. In 1993, he became an associate pastor at Metro Christian Fellowship, then pastored by Mike Bickle, in Kansas City, Missouri. 

In 2000, he left Kansas City to become a visiting associate professor at Wheaton College, in Wheaton, Illinois. In 2004, he left Wheaton College to found Enjoying God Ministries. 

In 2008 he became the lead pastor of Bridgeway Church in Oklahoma City, Oklahoma. Storms also serves on the board of Desiring God Ministries, Bethlehem College and Seminary and the Acts 29 Network.

Education
B.A. University of Oklahoma (1973)
Th.M. Dallas Theological Seminary (1977)
Ph.D. University of Texas (1984)

References

External links

1951 births
Living people
American Christian clergy
American Christian writers
People from Shawnee, Oklahoma
University of Oklahoma alumni
Dallas Theological Seminary alumni
University of Texas alumni